Smogolice  (German: Bruchhausen) is a village in the administrative district of Gmina Stargard, within Stargard County, West Pomeranian Voivodeship, in north-western Poland.

The village has a population of 87.

References

Smogolice